Eugene Richard Woodling (August 16, 1922 – June 2, 2001) was an American professional baseball player, coach and scout.

Woodling was a left-handed batter known as a line drive hitter who hit over .300 five times during his 17-year career and, had a .318 batting average during his five World Series appearances. He excelled defensively, leading American League outfielders in fielding or tied for the lead four times, and never made more than three errors in a season during his tenure with the Yankees.  Woodling also played for the Cleveland Indians, Pittsburgh Pirates, Baltimore Orioles, Washington Senators, and the New York Mets in their expansion year of 1962. His baseball career was interrupted by his military service in the United States Navy during the Second World War. After his playing career, he served several major league teams as a coach and a scout.

Playing career

Early career 
Woodling was born in Akron, Ohio where his father worked in a rubber factory. His professional baseball career began in 1940 in the Indians' organization. He missed the 1944 and 1945 seasons while serving in the United States Navy in the Pacific. Before coming to the majors for good in 1949, Woodling was a four-time minor league batting average champion. He mostly played left field (1,208 games) when he entered the majors, but appeared in 325 contests in right field and played 93 games in center.

Yankees career 
Woodling played with six teams during his career, the longest term of service being with the Yankees for six years and 698 of the 1,763 games played of his MLB career. With them, Woodling had what was probably his best year, 1953. Although he only had 395 at bats, he led the American League with a .429 on-base percentage. While Woodling was with the Yankees, the team won five consecutive World Series (1949–53). During that time, Yankee manager Casey Stengel praised the outfielder's ability to run and throw. Stengel generally platooned him with right-hander Hank Bauer, but each averaged 400 at bats per season. Woodling hit a solo home run in each World Series from 1951 through 1953, and, in 1951, helped Allie Reynolds secure his first of two no-hitters on the season, when he homered in a 1–0 win over Bob Feller and the Indians. In 1952, Woodling became the first player to pinch-hit a triple in the World Series. On November 17, 1954, a record 17-player deal took place between the Orioles and Yankees, involving Woodling, future 20-game winner Bob Turley and Don Larsen, who would go on to pitch a perfect game in the 1956 World Series for New York. Woodling had been sidelined for the last part of the 1954 season with a broken arm.

Later career 
Woodling returned to the Indians along with Billy Cox from the Orioles for Dave Pope, Wally Westlake and cash before the trade deadline on June 15, 1955. He set career-highs in home runs (19), runs batted in (78), and batting (.321) in 1957. A few months before he turned 40, he was sent to the New York Mets, where old Yankees manager Casey Stengel was working on his latest project, the newborn Mets. Woodling would be managed by Stengel for the remainder of the 1962 season. He was released before the 1963 season, after publicly criticizing the front office's contract negotiations with Marv Throneberry.

Overview 
In his 17-season career, Woodling batted .284 with 147 home runs and 830 RBI in 1,796 games. Woodling ended with a .386 on-base percentage and 1,585 career hits in 5,587 at bats. He hit .300 or better five times. In five World Series, Woodling hit .318 (27-85). As an outfielder, he recorded a .989 fielding percentage.

Post-playing days 
Woodling was appointed on November 20, 1963 as the Orioles' first-base coach by former Yankees teammate Hank Bauer, who had become the team's manager one day earlier. He remained in that capacity through the 1966 World Series Championship season and up until the announcement on September 28, 1967 that he would not be retained for the 1968 season. He was also a scout for the Yankees and the Indians. Woodling died at the age of 78 in a nursing home in Wadsworth, Ohio on June 2, 2001.

References

Sources

External links

Gene Woodling Oral History Interview (1 of 3) - National Baseball Hall of Fame Digital Collection
Gene Woodling Oral History Interview (2 of 3) - National Baseball Hall of Fame Digital Collection
Gene Woodling Oral History Interview (3 of 3) - National Baseball Hall of Fame Digital Collection

1922 births
2001 deaths
American League All-Stars
United States Navy personnel of World War II
Baltimore Orioles coaches
Baltimore Orioles players
Baseball players from Akron, Ohio
Cleveland Indians players
Cleveland Indians scouts
Charleston Senators players
Flint Arrows players
Major League Baseball first base coaches
Major League Baseball left fielders
Mansfield Braves players
Newark Bears (IL) players
New York Mets players
New York Yankees players
New York Yankees scouts
Pittsburgh Pirates players
San Francisco Seals (baseball) players
Washington Senators (1961–1971) players
Wilkes-Barre Barons (baseball) players